On March 12, 1815, a few days after the legal start of the 14th Congress, but long before the first meeting of that Congress, David Bard (DR), who'd been re-elected to the , died.  A special election was held on October 10 to fill the vacancy left by his death.

Election results

The 9th district did not change parties with this election.  On December 11, Burnside took his seat in the 14th Congress.  He would subsequently resign, in April, 1816, to accept a judicial position, resulting in a second special election.  He thus served for only a few months as Representative.

See also
List of special elections to the United States House of Representatives

References

Pennsylvania 1815 09
Pennsylvania 1815 09
1815 09
Pennsylvania 09
United States House of Representatives 09
United States House of Representatives 1815 09